Nie Meng (born 7 February 1998) is a Chinese footballer currently playing as a left-back for Dandong Tengyue.

Career statistics

Club
.

References

1998 births
Living people
Chinese footballers
China youth international footballers
Association football defenders
Shanghai Port F.C. players